Patricia Bizzell, Ph.D. is a Professor of English, emerita, and former Chairperson of the English Department at College of the Holy Cross, United States, where she taught from 1978 to 2019. She founded and directed the Writer's Workshop, a peer tutoring facility, and a writing-across-the-curriculum program. She directed the College Honors and English Honors programs and taught first-year composition, rhetoric and public speaking, nineteenth-century American literature, and women's literature. A scholar and writer, Bizzell has authored or co-authored half a dozen books, written dozens of articles and book chapters, composed more than a dozen book reviews and review essays, and presented a large number of papers at academic conferences. Bizzell is the 2008 winner of the CCCC Exemplar Award, and former president of Rhetoric Society of America.

Areas of Scholarly Focus 
Bizzell's research interests include the question of how the increasing diversification of academic discourses affects the teaching of writing to college students, with a special focus on students that she terms "basic writers."  Bizzell, throughout her career, has focused on students coming from traditionally disadvantaged economic and social backgrounds in order to study how rhetoric and composition can be effectively taught to students coming from a diverse range of backgrounds.

Bizzell is also the subject of a profile chapter in Women's Ways of Making It in Rhetoric and Composition, edited by Michelle Balliff, Diane Davis, and Roxanne Mountford. The book aims to share both the successes and failures of women in the field of rhetoric and composition, with the aim of inspiring other women to enter the field.  The book covers a range of topics from encountering sexism in the workplace and balancing a career and family life, issues that are further addressed in the chapter on Bizzell. This chapter offers further insight into Bizzell's scholarly interests and areas of research.

Influential Works 
Bizzell has written numerous books, book chapters, and articles throughout her career.  Some of her most influential works are outlined below.

In Academic Discourse and Critical Consciousness, Bizzell traces her experiences as of teaching first-year college composition courses. The essays, written over a number of years, come together to provide insights into how her teaching and thinking about pedagogy have changed over the years. Compiling the essays in this way traces a trajectory of how thinking about and implementing teaching practices have evolved for Bizzell over her number of years of experience. The essay collection has an extensive focus on what happens when students from diverse backgrounds are asked to use language in specific ways in college classrooms, tracing practices and pedagogies that have been successful in her own classrooms over the years.

Bizzell's article "Cognition, Convention, and Certainty: What We Need to Know About Writing" explores the relationship between students' ability to engage in thoughtful contemplation and their writing abilities. The relationship between thought and language, according to Bizzell, needs to be given more careful consideration in the composition classroom. It is only by helping students learn to frame their thinking that teachers can help them to be productive and successful writers.

"What Happens When Basic Writers Come to College?" tries to answer one of the research questions that seems to be most central to Bizzell's research. This article examines what happens when students with diverse backgrounds, dialects, and class standings come together in a college composition classroom. Bizzell, using her own teaching experience as part of her research, delves into how these students can find success in college classrooms and settings.

Professional experience

Teaching positions 
Chair, Department of English, College of the Holy Cross, 2001-2005
Professor of English, Holy Cross, 1988–present: composition, rhetoric, American Literature
Director, English Honors Program, 1999-2000
Director, College Honors Program, 1994-1998
Director, Writing Programs, 1981-1994 (Writer's Workshop and Writing-across-the-Curriculum Program)
Associate Professor, Holy Cross, 1981-1988
Assistant Professor, Holy Cross, 1978–81
Assistant Professor, Rutgers University, 1975–78, and Director, Remedial Writing Program, 1975–77, and Teacher Training Program, 1977–78

Professional affiliations and activities 
 President, Rhetoric Society of America, 2004-2006
 Program Chair, RSA 2004 biennial national conference
 President, Board of Directors, Alliance of Rhetoric Societies, 2006 (ARS)

Academic background 
 Ph.D. in English Literature, Rutgers University, 1975.
 B.A. summa cum laude, Wellesley College, 1970.
 Enrolled in the M.J.L.S. (Masters, Jewish Liberal Studies) program at Hebrew College

Prizes and external grants received 
 Winner, National Council of Teachers of English Outstanding Book Award, 1992, for The Rhetorical Tradition: Readings from Classical Times to the Present (co-authored with Bruce Herzberg).
 Winner, National Council of Writing Program Administrators Best Book Award, 2000, for Coming of Age: The Advanced Writing Curriculum, eds. Linda Shamoon, Sandra Jamieson, Rebecca Howard, and Robert Schwegler, which included Bizzell's essay "Writing as a Means of Social Change".

Books published 

 

  (Alternate title: Negotiating Difference: Cultural Case Studies for Composition)

References

External links
 Prof. Patricia Bizzell's home page at Holy Cross
 Rhetoric Society of America

Living people
College of the Holy Cross faculty
Year of birth missing (living people)
Wellesley College alumni
Rutgers University alumni
American academics of English literature